Albert Geoffrey Howson (1931 – 1 November 2022) was a British mathematician and educationist.

He started to work as algebraist and in 1954 published the Howson property of groups and proved it for some types of groups.
Later he devoted himself to the mathematics education and participated in reforms of mathematics education in the Great Britain and internationally.
He was the editor-in-chief and chairman of Trustees of the School Mathematics Project in Great Britain and was involved in many other national and international projects.
He worked at University of Southampton as head of the Department of Mathematics and Dean of the Faculty of Mathematical Studies and served as president of the Mathematical Association of Great Britain, and two terms as Secretary of the International Commission on Mathematical Instruction.

Howson died on 1 November 2022, aged 91.

References 

British mathematicians
1931 births
2022 deaths